The 2021 Chinese Football Association Cup, officially known as the Yanjing Beer 2021 Chinese FA Cup (Chinese: 燕京啤酒2021中国足球协会杯) for sponsorship reasons, was the 23rd edition of the Chinese FA Cup.

The defending champions were Chinese Super League side Shandong Taishan. They retained the trophy, beating Shanghai Port 1–0 in the final.

Schedule

First round
The draw for the first round was held on 20 July 2021. The winners of the first round advanced to the second round.

Second round
The draw for the second round was held on 20 July 2021. The winners of the second round advanced to the third round.

Third round
The draw for the third round was held on 20 July 2021. The winners of the third round advanced to the fourth round.

Fourth round
32 teams qualified to this round. The draw for the fourth round was held on 29 September 2021.

Fifth round
The draw for the fifth round was held on 29 September 2021.

Quarter-finals
The draw for the quarter-finals was held on 29 September 2021.

First leg

Second leg

Semi-finals
The draw for the semi-finals was held on 29 September 2021.

First leg

Second leg

Final
The final was played on 9 January 2022 in Chengdu.

Notes

References

2021
2021 in Chinese football
2021 Asian domestic association football cups